The 1914 Wisconsin gubernatorial election was held on November 3, 1914.

Incumbent Republican Governor Francis E. McGovern retired to run for U.S. Senate.

Republican nominee Emanuel L. Philipp defeated Democratic nominee John C. Karel, Progressive nominee John J. Blaine and Socialist nominee Oscar Ameringer, with 43.26% of the vote.

Primary elections
Primary elections were held on September 1, 1914.

Democratic primary

Candidates
John C. Karel, Milwaukee County Court judge, Democratic nominee for Governor in 1912
John A. Aylward, Democratic nominee for Governor in 1906 and 1908

Results

Republican primary

Candidates
Andrew H. Dahl, former State Treasurer of Wisconsin
William H. Hatton, former State Senator
Merlin Hull, Speaker of the Wisconsin State Assembly
Emanuel L. Philipp, Milwaukee Police Commissioner
Henry E. Roethe, member of the Wisconsin State Assembly
Bruce W. Utman

Results

Socialist primary

Candidates
Oscar Ameringer, newspaper editor

Results

Prohibition primary

Candidates
David W. Emerson, Prohibition nominee for Wisconsin's 11th congressional district in 1912

Results

General election

Candidates
The Republican Party (United States) backed Emanuel L. Philipp a railroad executive for his first of three successful campaigns, the Democratic Party (United States) backed John C. Karel a former member of the Wisconsin State Assembly and a failed candidate for governor in 1912, the Progressive Party backed the future governor, Senator and Attorney General of Wisconsin John J. Blaine and the Socialist Party of America backed Socialist editor, author, and organizer Oscar Ameringer.

Major party candidates
Emanuel L. Philipp, Republican
John C. Karel, Democratic

Other candidates
John J. Blaine, Progressive
David W. Emerson, Prohibition
Oscar Ameringer, Socialist (Social-Democratic Party of Wisconsin)
John Vierthaler, Socialist Labor, Socialist Labor nominee for Lieutenant Governor in 1912

Results

Notes

References

Bibliography
  
 
 

1914
Wisconsin
Gubernatorial
November 1914 events